Stan Dewulf (born 20 December 1997) is a Belgian cyclist, who currently rides for UCI WorldTeam . In October 2020, he was named in the startlist for the 2020 Vuelta a España.

Major results

2014
 1st  Overall Keizer der Juniores
2015
 2nd  Road race, UEC European Junior Road Championships
 3rd Paris–Roubaix Juniors
 3rd Grote Prijs André Noyelle
 4th Menen–Kemmel–Menen
2016
 8th Dwars door de Vlaamse Ardennen
 8th Overall Olympia's Tour
2017
 3rd Overall Tour de Bretagne
 3rd Overall Olympia's Tour
 3rd Road race, National Under–23 Road Championships
 4th Overall Le Triptyque des Monts et Châteaux
 5th Grand Prix Criquielion
 9th Omloop Het Nieuwsblad Beloften
2018
 1st Paris–Roubaix Espoirs
 2nd Overall Le Triptyque des Monts et Châteaux
1st Stages 3a (ITT) & 3b
 2nd Overall Tour de Bretagne
1st  Young rider classification
 3rd Okolo Jižních Čech
1st  Young rider classification
1st Stage 1 (TTT)
 3rd Ringerike GP
 6th Liège–Bastogne–Liège U23
 6th Gylne Gutuer
 9th Overall Paris–Arras Tour
2020
 2nd Antwerp Port Epic
  Combativity award Stage 8 Vuelta a España
2021
 1st Boucles de l'Aulne
 2nd Overall Tour de Wallonie
 4th Paris–Tours
 5th Binche–Chimay–Binche
2022
 4th Le Samyn
 9th Tro-Bro Léon

Grand Tour general classification results timeline

References

External links

1997 births
Living people
Belgian male cyclists
People from Alveringem
Cyclists from West Flanders
21st-century Belgian people